Baseball at the Pacific Games.

Results

Notes:
MG denotes Pacific Mini Games.

See also
Oceania Baseball Championship
Baseball at the Micronesian Games

References

External links
Results, 2003–2005 at Sporting Pulse

 
Pacific Games
Pacific Games
Pacific Games